A cloud database is a database that typically runs on a cloud computing platform and access to the database is provided as-a-service. There are two common deployment models: users can run databases on the cloud independently, using a virtual machine image, or they can purchase access to a database service, maintained by a cloud database provider. Of the databases available on the cloud, some are SQL-based and some use a NoSQL data model.

Database services take care of scalability and high availability of the database. Database services make the underlying software-stack transparent to the user.

Deployment models 

There are two primary methods to run a database on a cloud platform:

 Virtual machine image Cloud platforms allow users to purchase virtual-machine instances for a limited time, and one can run a database on such virtual machines. Users can either upload their own machine image with a database installed on it, or use ready-made machine images that already include an optimized installation of a database. 
 Database-as-a-service (DBaaS) With a database as a service model, users pay fees to a cloud provider for services and computing resources, reducing the amount of money and effort needed to develop and manage databases. Users are given tools to create and manage database instances, and control users. Some cloud providers also offer tools to manage database structures and data. Many cloud providers offer both relational (Amazon RDS, SQL Server) and NoSQL (MongoDB, Amazon DynamoDB) databases. This is a type of software as a service (SaaS).

Architecture and common characteristics 
 Most database services offer web-based consoles, which the end user can use to provision and configure database instances.
 Database services consist of a database-manager component, which controls the underlying database instances using a service API. The service API is exposed to the end user, and permits users to perform maintenance and scaling operations on their database instances.
 Underlying software-stack stack typically includes the operating system, the database and third-party software used to manage the database. The service provider is responsible for installing, patching and updating the underlying software stack and ensuring the overall health and performance of the database.
 Scalability features differ between vendorssome offer auto-scaling, others enable the user to scale up using an API, but do not scale automatically.
 There is typically a commitment for a certain level of high availability (e.g. 99.9% or 99.99%). This is achieved by replicating data and failing instances over to other database instances.

Data model 
The design and development of typical systems utilize data management and relational databases as their key building blocks.  Advanced queries expressed in SQL work well with the strict relationships that are imposed on information by relational databases.  However, relational database technology was not initially designed or developed for use over distributed systems.  This issue has been addressed with the addition of clustering enhancements to the relational databases, although some basic tasks require complex and expensive protocols, such as with data synchronization.

Modern relational databases have shown poor performance on data-intensive systems, therefore, the idea of NoSQL has been utilized within database management systems for cloud based systems.  Within NoSQL implemented storage, there are no requirements for fixed table schemas, and the use of join operations is avoided.  "The  NoSQL  databases  have  proven  to  provide  efficient  horizontal  scalability,  good  performance, and ease of assembly into cloud applications." Data models relying on simplified relay algorithms have also been employed in data-intensive cloud mapping applications unique to virtual frameworks.

It is also important to differentiate between cloud databases which are relational as opposed to non-relational or NoSQL:
 SQL databases SQL databases are one type of database which can run in the cloud, either in a virtual machine or as a service, depending on the vendor. While SQL databases are easily vertically scalable, horizontal scalability poses a challenge, that cloud database services based on SQL have started to address.
 NoSQL databases NoSQL databases are another type of database which can run in the cloud. NoSQL databases are built to service heavy read/write loads and can scale up and down easily, and therefore they are more natively suited to running in the cloud. However, most contemporary applications are built around an SQL data model, so working with NoSQL databases often requires a complete rewrite of application code.
 Some SQL databases have developed NoSQL capabilities including JSON, binary JSON (e.g. BSON or similar variants), and key-value store data types.
 A multi-model database with relational and non-relational capabilities provides a standard SQL interface to users and applications and thus facilitates the usage of such databases for contemporary applications built around an SQL data model. Native multi-model databases support multiple data models with one core and a unified query language to access all data models.

Vendors 
The following table lists notable database vendors with a cloud database offering, classified by their deployment model – machine image vs. database as a service – and data model, SQL vs. NoSQL.

See also 
 Cloud computing
 Cloud storage
 Data as a service
 Relational database

References 

Cloud computing
Types of databases
 
As a service